This is a list of prefects of Sisak-Moslavina County.

Prefects of Sisak-Moslavina County (1993–present)

See also
Sisak-Moslavina County

Notes

External links
World Statesmen - Sisak-Moslavina County

Sisak-Moslavina County